This is a list of notable books and works in the English language written about Pakistan.

History
B. R. Ambedkar (1946). Pakistan or the Partition of India. Bombay: Thackers Publishers. 
K K Aziz, The Murder of History in Pakistan: A critique of history textbooks used in Pakistan, Vanguard Books Pvt Ltd, Lahore, 1993.
 Seshadri, H. V. (2013). The tragic story of partition. Bangalore : Sahitya Sindhu Prakashana, 2013.
 Rosser, Yvette. Islamization of Pakistani Social Studies Textbooks, RUPA, New Delhi, 2003.
 Masood Ashraf Raja. Constructing Pakistan: Foundational Texts and the Rise of Muslim National Identity, 1857–1947, Oxford 2010, 
Nayyar, A. H. & Salim, Ahmad. (2003) The Subtle Subversion: The State of Curricula and Text-books in Pakistan - Urdu, English, Social Studies and Civics. Sustainable Development Policy Institute. The Subtle Subversion
Mubarak Ali. In the Shadow of history, Nigarshat, Lahore; History on Trial, Fiction House, Lahore, 1999; Tareekh Aur Nisabi Kutub, Fiction House, Lahore, 2003.
Purifying the Land of the Pure: Pakistan's Religious Minorities by Farahnaz Ispahani, Publisher: Harper Collins India
Dastidar, S. G. (2008). Empire's last casualty: Indian subcontinent's vanishing Hindu and other minorities. Kolkata: Firma KLM.
Kamra, A. J. (2000). The prolonged partition and its pogroms: Testimonies on violence against Hindus in East Bengal 1946-64.
Spear, Percival (2007), India, Pakistan and the West. Read books publishers, 
Wolpert, Stanley. Jinnah of Pakistan. Oxford University Press, USA. May 1984. 
Yasmeen Niaz Mohiuddin, Pakistan: a global studies handbook. ABC-CLIO publishers, 2006,

Politics, foreign relations and military
Ayres, Robert (1998), Turning Point: The End of the Growth Paradigm. James & James publishers, 
Fair, C. Christine, The Militant Challenge in Pakistan (Asia Policy, January 2011)
Ian, Talbot (1999). The Armed Forces of Pakistan. Macmillan publishers, 
Rubinstein, W. D. (2004). Genocide: a history. Pearson Longman Publishers, 
Pervez Hoodbhoy and A. H. Nayyar. "Rewriting the history of Pakistan", in Islam, Politics and the state: The Pakistan Experience, Ed. Mohammad Asghar Khan, Zed Books, London, 1985
Ḥaqqānī, H. (2016). Pakistan: Between mosque and military. Gurgaon, Haryana : Viking, 2016
Haqqani, H. (2015). Magnificent delusions: Pakistan, the United States, and an epic history of misunderstanding.  New York : PublicAffairs
Ḥaqqānī, H. (2016). India vs Pakistan: Why can't we just be friends?. New Delhi, India : Juggernaut, 2016.
Lieven, A. (2012). Pakistan: A hard country. London: Penguin
Tariq Rahman, Denizens of Alien Worlds: A Study of Education, Inequality and Polarization in Pakistan Karachi, Oxford University Press, 2004. Reprint. 2006
Tariq Rahman, Language, Ideology and Power: Language learning among the Muslims of Pakistan and North India Karachi, Oxford UP, 2002
Tariq Rahman, Language and Politics in Pakistan Karachi: Oxford UP, 1996. Rept. several times. see 2006 edition.

Religion, culture and arts
 Zaman, Muhammad Qasim, Islam in Pakistan: A History (Princeton UP, 2018) online review
Wink, Andre, Al-Hind: The Making of the Indo-Islamic World, Brill Academic Publishers, 1 January 1996, 
 Masood Ashraf Raja. Constructing Pakistan: Foundational Texts and the Rise of Muslim National Identity, 1857–1947, Oxford 2010, 
Seyyed Vali Reza Nasr, The Vanguard of the Islamic Revolution: The Jama`at-i Islami of Pakistan (University of California Press, 1994)

Society and people
 For Hire (2010), Experiences by a taxi driver, Ferozsons Publishers
Fabry Ph., (1995) Wandering with the Indus, Yusuf Shahid (text) Lahore, Ferozsons, 152 p., ISBN 969-0-10224-9
Naipaul, V. S. (2011). Among the Believers: An Islamic Journey 
 Seth, P. N. (2009). Lahore to Delhi: Rising from the ashes : autobiography of a refugee from Pakistan Bangalore: Punya Pub.

See also

 Muhammad Iqbal bibliography
 List of books about K2
 Pakistan Economy

 

Pakistan-related lists
Pakistan studies